The Ambassador of Italy in Belarus (in Belarusian, Пасол Італіі ў Беларусі) is the head of the diplomatic mission of the Italian Republic in the Republic of Belarus. The current ambassador in charge since April 26, 2018 is Norberto Cappello.

History 
Italy and Belarus began diplomatic relations following independence on July 27, 1990. Relations between the two nations are established in the protocol for the establishment of diplomatic relations signed on April 13, 1992 by the foreign ministers of the two countries, Pëtr Kravčenko and Gianni De Michelis, during his first official visit to Italy by a Belarusian government delegation led by the Prime Minister Vjačaslaŭ Kebič.

In May 1992 the embassy in Minsk was opened and Gian Luca Bertinetto was the first ambassador.

List 
The following is a list of Italian ambassadors to Belarus.

References

External links 

 Official site of the Italian Embassy in Minsk, on ambminsk.esteri.it. (In Russian and Italian)

Lists of ambassadors to Belarus
Lists of ambassadors of Italy